The 2010 Central African Republic League was the top division football competition in the Central African Republic in 2010.

League table

References

Football in the Central African Republic
Association football in Africa